Might and Magic is a series of role-playing video games from New World Computing, which in 1996 became a subsidiary of The 3DO Company. The original Might and Magic series ended with the closure of the 3DO Company. The rights to the Might and Magic name were purchased for US$1.3 million by Ubisoft, who "rebooted" the franchise with a new series with no apparent connection to the previous continuity, starting with the games Heroes of Might and Magic V and Dark Messiah of Might and Magic.

History

Main series
Might and Magic Book One: The Secret of the Inner Sanctum (1986; Apple II, Mac, MS-DOS, Commodore 64, NES, MSX, PC-Engine CD-ROM²)
Might and Magic II: Gates to Another World (1988; Apple II, Amiga, MS-DOS, Commodore 64, Mac, Genesis, Super NES (Europe only), Super Famicom (Japan-only, different from the European Super NES version), MSX)
Might and Magic III: Isles of Terra (1991; MS-DOS, Mac, Amiga, Super NES, Genesis (prototype), Sega CD, PC-Engine Super CD-ROM²)
Might and Magic IV: Clouds of Xeen (1992; MS-DOS, Mac)
Might and Magic V: Darkside of Xeen (1993; MS-DOS, Mac)
Might and Magic: World of Xeen (1994; MS-DOS, Mac)
Might and Magic VI: The Mandate of Heaven (1998; Windows)
Might and Magic VII: For Blood and Honor (1999; Windows)
Might and Magic VIII: Day of the Destroyer (2000; Windows)
Might and Magic IX: Writ of Fate (2002; Windows)
Might & Magic X: Legacy (2014; Windows, OS X)

Spin-offs 
There have been several spin-offs from the main series, including the long-running Heroes of Might and Magic series, Crusaders of Might and Magic, Warriors of Might and Magic, Shifters of Might and Magic, Legends of Might and Magic, Might and Magic: Heroes Kingdoms, and the fan-made Swords of Xeen.

In August 2003, Ubisoft acquired the rights to the Might and Magic franchise for US$1.3 million after 3DO filed for Chapter 11 bankruptcy. Ubisoft has since released multiple new projects using the Might and Magic brand, including a fifth installment of the Heroes series developed by Nival, an action-style game Dark Messiah of Might and Magic developed by Arkane Studios, a puzzle RPG Might & Magic: Clash of Heroes developed by Capybara Games, and the mobile strategy RPG titled Might & Magic: Elemental Guardians.

Gameplay
The majority of the gameplay takes place in a medieval fantasy setting, while later sections of the games are often based on science fiction tropes, the transition often serving as a plot twist. The player controls a party of player characters, which can consist of members of various character classes.  The game world is presented to the player in first person perspective. In the earlier games the interface is very similar to that of Bard's Tale, but from Might and Magic VI: The Mandate of Heaven onward, the interface features a three-dimensional environment. Combat is turn-based, though the later games allowed the player to choose to conduct combat in real time.

The game worlds in all of the Might and Magic games are quite large, and a player can expect each game to provide several dozen hours of gameplay.  It is usually quite combat-intensive and often involves large groups of enemy creatures.  Monsters and situations encountered throughout the series tend to be well-known fantasy staples such as giant rats, werewolf curses, dragon flights and zombie hordes, rather than original creations. Isles of Terra and the Xeen games featured a more distinct environment, blending fantasy and science fiction elements in a unique way.

The Might and Magic games have some replay value as the player can choose their party composition, develop different skills, choose sides, do quests in a different order, hunt for hidden secrets and easter eggs, and/or change difficulty level.

Plot
Although most of the gameplay reflects a distinctly fantasy genre, the overarching plot of the first nine games has something of a science fiction background. The series is set in a fictional galaxy as part of an alternative universe, where planets are overseen by a powerful race of space travelers known as Ancients who seeded them with humans, elves, dwarves and others. In each of the games, a party of characters fights monsters and completes quests on one of these planets, until they eventually become involved in the affairs of the Ancients. Might and Magic could as such be considered an example of science fantasy.

The producer of the series was Jon Van Caneghem. Van Caneghem has stated in interview that the Might and Magic setting is inspired by his love for both science fiction and fantasy. He cites The Twilight Zone and the Star Trek episode For the World is Hollow and I Have Touched the Sky as having inspired Might and Magic lore.

The first five games in the series concern the renegade guardian of the planet Terra, named Sheltem, who becomes irrevocably corrupted, developing a penchant for throwing planets into their suns. Sheltem establishes himself on a series of flat worlds known as nacelles (which are implied to be giant spaceships) and Corak, a second guardian and creation of the Ancients, with the assistance of the player characters, pursues him across the Void. Eventually both Corak and Sheltem are destroyed in a climactic battle on the nacelle of Xeen.

The sixth, seventh and eighth games take place on Enroth, a single planet partially ruled by the Ironfist dynasty, and chronicle the events and aftermath of an invasion by the Kreegan (colloquially referred to as Devils), the demonlike arch-enemies of the Ancients. It is also revealed that the destruction wrought by the Ancients' wars with the Kreegan is the reason why the worlds of Might & Magic exist as medieval fantasy settings despite once being seeded with futuristic technology – the worlds have been 'cut off' from the Ancients and descended into barbarism. The first through third games in the Heroes of Might and Magic series traces the fortunes of the Ironfists in more detail. None of the science fiction elements appear in the Heroes series besides the appearance of Kreegan characters in Heroes of Might and Magic III and IV. Might & Magic IX and Heroes IV take place on Axeoth, another planet which the survivors of Enroth were brought to through portals after it was destroyed in an event called the Reckoning.

The Ubisoft release Might & Magic X: Legacy departs from this continuity and is set in the world of Ashan. Ashan is a high fantasy setting with no science fiction elements in its lore.

Reception
Might and Magic is considered one of the defining examples of early role-playing video games, along with The Bard's Tale, Ultima and Wizardry series. By March 1994, combined sales of the Might and Magic series totaled 1 million units. The number rose to 2.5 million sales by November 1996. and 4 million by March 1999.

References

External links 
Official franchise website (2000) (archived)
Official franchise website (2014) (archived)

 The plot and history of the Might and Magic series on Celestial Heavens
 List of Might and Magic releases including games, books, and other collectibles
 Might and Magic World

 
Ubisoft franchises
New World Computing games
Role-playing video games
Video game franchises
Video games about magic
Science fantasy video games
Video game franchises introduced in 1986
First-person party-based dungeon crawler video games